Tin ingots were a trading currency unique to Malacca.

Ten blocks made up one unit called a small bundle, and 40 blocks made up one large bundle.

Details of tin production in early Malacca were recorded in the 1436 book Description of the Starry Raft by Fei Xin, a translator of Admiral Zheng He.

See also

 Tin Animal Money

References
 Description of the Starry Raft (1436) Xin Cha Shen Lan 星槎勝覽

History of Malacca
Obsolete currencies in Malaysian history